Johannes Albers (March 8, 1890 – March 8, 1963) was a German politician of the Christian Democratic Union (CDU) and former member of the German Bundestag.

Life 
From 1946 to 1950 Albers was a member of the state parliament of North Rhine-Westphalia. From 1949 to 1957 he was a member of the German Bundestag. In 1949/50 he was chairman of the Bundestag Committee for Reconstruction and Housing. Since 31 January 1951 he had been deputy chairman of the CDU parliamentary group.

Literature

References

1890 births
1963 deaths
Members of the Bundestag for North Rhine-Westphalia
Members of the Bundestag 1953–1957
Members of the Bundestag 1949–1953
Members of the Bundestag for the Christian Democratic Union of Germany
Members of the Landtag of North Rhine-Westphalia